Pallaskenry is a village in County Limerick, Ireland.

Pallaskenry derives its name from Kenry Castle (the palisaded castle at Kenry), nowadays known as Shanpallas Castle.[Topographical Dictionary of Ireland, p455, Lewis]. It was one of the principal ancient castles of County Limerick. [The Journal of The Royal Society of Antiquaries of Ireland, Volume 37, p25].   Kenry Castle was the original property of Russells as part of the territories or Ardcanny and Chapelrussell (incl. Pallas itself) which was acquired by the first Knight of Glin, Sir John fitz John. It was later in the possession of Henry Fitzgerald, grandson of the first Knight in 1330 and served as an important sub-manor of the Earls of Desmond right through to 1652.
The town is reached by travelling about five kilometres (~3 miles) north off the N69 National Route that runs west from the city. Pallaskenry is a satellite town of Limerick city, many of its inhabitants work in the city but many also work in Shannon Town, County Clare (north across the estuary), and Askeaton, a town further west of Pallaskenry.

A pier on the Shannon Estuary is located a couple of kilometers further north of the town, at Ringmoylan. This point is almost directly across the estuary from Shannon Town, and offers a good view of airplanes landing and taking off at Shannon Airport.

Education
Pallaskenry has a primary school (St. Mary's) with 168 students, a secondary school (Salesian Secondary College, formerly Copsewood College, with approximately 702 students), and a pre-school (Kiddies Corner) located in the community centre. Author Darren Shan attended Copsewood College, and has lived close to the village most of his life. He opened the primary school's new school library in June 2008. Copsewood also is home to Pallaskenry Agricultural College.

Sport
Pallaskenry GAA Club is one of the oldest GAA clubs in Limerick founded in 1906.

History
There are several castles in the area, including Cullam Castle, Ballyculhane Castle, Kenry Castle and Dromore Castle. Dromore Castle is unusual in that it was built late in the 19th century in the style of a fairytale castle.

There have been a number of archaeological finds in the area, including the Shannongrove Collar which was found at a depth of 12 feet in a bog on lands granted to Phineas Bury during Cromwellian plantations. A bone crucifix was found in the 1950s at Dog's Island, the boggy ground between Dromore Lake and a very small lake east of it. A carved early-medieval head was found at Kenry Castle.

Services 
On main street Pallaskenry there is a Chinese restaurant and takeaway, a chip shop, a hairdresser, a café, a barber, two pubs and two local shops. There is also a funeral home. The non retail services include a 150-year-old church and a post office.

Population 
Pallaskenry's population was 651 at the 2016 census. The population in the 2011 census was listed as being 664 people. This had increased from 469 people in 1991.

See also
 List of towns and villages in Ireland

References

External link

Towns and villages in County Limerick